Louis-Hyacinthe Duflost (15 April 1814 – 8 May 1887), known as Hyacinthe, was a French actor and operetta singer.

Life
Born in Amiens, he became a comic actor very early in life – his father was wigmaker to the magician Louis Compte, whose troupe he joined aged seven. He was part of several companies, including the Ambigu, the Vaudeville and the Variétés. In 1847 he moved to the company of the Palais-Royal, where he remained until his death and appeared very regularly in plays by Eugène Labiche.

His reputation was partly founded on his large nose, remembered by Parisians long after his death. He lived in Montmartre with his wife and children, most notably during the siege of Paris, when he joined the 32nd Battalion of the Garde Nationale aged 60. He later retired to 3 rue d'Orléans in Asnières, where he died in 1887.

His main rôles

Variétés
 Gringalet in Les Saltimbanques by Dumersan and Varin (25 janvier 1838)
 The seducer in Les Trois Épiciers
 Faucheux in Le Maître d'école by Lockroy and Anicet-Bourgeois (20 mars 1841)
 Thibaudeau in Ma maîtresse et ma femme by Dumanoir and Adolphe d'Ennery (25 novembre 1842)

Palais-Royal - Labiche
 Gindinet in Le Club champenois (1848)
 Arcas in Une tragédie chez M. Grassot (1848)
 Panari in Les Manchettes d’un vilain (1849)
 Balourdeau in Exposition des produits de la République (1849)
 Mazulim in Le Sopha (1850)
 Pépinois in Maman Sabouleux (1852)
 Piccolet in Piccolet (1852)
 Roussin in Un ut de poitrine (1853)
 Antoine in La Chasse aux corbeaux (1853)
 Beauvoisin in Un feu de cheminée (1853)
 Gigomir in Espagnolas et Boyardinos (1854)
 Colardeau in Ôtez votre fille, s'il vous plaît (1854)
 Népomucène in La Fiancée du bon coin (1856)
 Léopardin in Si jamais je te pince!... (1856)
 Mistingue in L'Affaire de la rue de Lourcine (1857)
 Bengalo in La Dame aux jambes d'azur (1857)
 Anatole in Les Noces de Bouchencœur (1857)
 Évariste in Le Grain de café (1858)
 Tchikuli in En avant les Chinois ! (1858)
 Colache in L'Amour, un fort volume, prix 3 F 50 c (1859)
 Jesabel in Voyage autour de ma marmite (1859)
 Bougnol in La Sensitive (1860)
 Malfilatre in La Famille de l'horloger (1860)
 Pénuri in Les 37 sous de M. Montaudoin (1862)
 Bocardon in Célimare le bien-aimé (1863)
 Tapiou in Les Chemins de fer (1867)
 Sancier in Le Papa du prix d'honneur (1868)
 Gargaret in Doit-on le dire ? (1872)
 Ernest Fador in La Pièce de Chambertin (1874)
 Hochard in Les Samedis de Madame (1874)
 prince Poupoulos in La Clé (1874 et 1877)

Palais-Royale - other authors
 Arthur de Clichy in Le Fils de la belle au bois dormant (1858) by Lambert-Thiboust, Paul Siraudin and Adolphe Choler
 Nérée Dusorbet  in La Pénélope à la mode de Caen (1860) by Lambert-Thiboust, Paul Siraudin and Eugène Grangé
 Picardeau  in Les Femmes sérieuses (1864) by Paul Siraudin, Alfred Delacour and Ernest Blum
 The baron de Gondremarck in La Vie parisienne  (1866) by Henri Meilhac and Ludovic Halévy, music by  Jacques Offenbach
 Maître Massepain in Le château à Toto  (1868) by Meilhac and Halévy, music by Jacques Offenbach
 Chiffardin in Le Carnaval d’un merle blanc (1868) by Henri Chivot and Alfred Duru
 the marquis de Castel-Bombé in La Vie de château (1869) by Henri Chivot and Alfred Duru
 Alfred in Le Réveillon (1872) by Meilhac and Halévy
 le duc de la Butte-Jonvel in La Tribune mécanique (1872) by Georges Vibert and Étienne-Prosper Berne-Bellecour
 Les Échos de Paris ou la Revue en retard (1873) by Henri Chivot and Alfred Duru
 Alcide Malicorne in Ici, Médor (1875) by Verconsin
 Birochet in Le Panache (1875) by Edmond Gondinet
 Pulverin in L’Homme du Lapin blanc (1875) by Alfred Duru
 Vernouillet in La Chaste Suzanne (1877) by Paul Ferrier
 Édouard in Les Demoiselles de Montfermeil (1878) by Victor Bernard and Théodore Barrière
 Belgodère in Tant plus ça change (1878) by Edmond Gondinet and Pierre Véron
 Beaudichon in Le Volcan (1882) by Edmond Gondinet, François Oswald and Pierre Giffard
 Brochondans in Le Train de plaisir (1884) by Alfred Hennequin, Albert de Saint-Albin et Arnold Mortier
 Lord in La Fille à Georgette (1886) by Albin Valabrègue.

References

External links
http://www.lesarchivesduspectacle.net/index.php?IDX_Personne=68108

19th-century French male actors
French male stage actors
19th-century French male opera singers
1814 births
1887 deaths
People from Amiens